Yunnan camellia is common name for several camellia species, and may refer to:

 Camellia reticulata, native to southwestern China
 Camellia yunnanensis

Camellia